Chickweed is a common name most often applied to the plant species Stellaria media. Stellaria media is a common weed in North America and Europe and is an edible plant.

Chickweed is sometimes used as a common name for several other plants, many of which are relatives of Stellaria media in the family Caryophyllaceae:

 Ageratum conyzoides - Chickweed
 Cerastium - Mouse-ear chickweed
 Holosteum - Jagged chickweed
 Moenchia - Upright chickweed
 Paronychia - Chickweed
 Stellaria pro parte - Chickweed
 Stellaria media - Common chickweed

Caryophyllaceae